Diadexia argyropasta is a moth in the family Crambidae. It was described by Turner in 1911. It is found in Australia, where it has been recorded from the Northern Territory.

References

Crambinae
Moths described in 1911